Senjōgahara (戦場ヶ原) is a  area in Tochigi Prefecture, Japan, in the city of Nikkō.

Senjōgahara can be translated as 'battlefield' but refers to a mythical battle, and not to any historical one.

It lies just to the east of Odashirogahara.

References

Plateaus of Japan
Landforms of Tochigi Prefecture
Ramsar sites in Japan